Nosek (Czech and Slovak feminine: Nosková) is a West Slavic surname, meaning "small nose". Notable people include:

Nosek
Brian Nosek (born ?), American social psychologist
David Nosek (born 1981), Czech ice hockey player
Jakub Nosek (born 1989), Czech deaf bobsledder and Olympics competitor
Luke Nosek (born 1975/1976), American entrepreneur
Margaret Nosek (1952–2020), American disability rights activist
Martin Nosek (born 1987), Slovak footballer
Randy Nosek (born 1967), American baseball player
Tomáš Nosek (born 1992), Czech ice hockey player
Václav Nosek (1892–1955), Czech communist politician

Nosková
Linda Nosková, Czech tennis player
Michaela Nosková (born 1983), Czech pop singer, recording artist, and musical theater performer
Nikola Nosková (born 1997), Czech road cyclist and cyclo-cross racer
Petra Nosková (born 1967), Czech biathlete and Olympics competitor
Tereza Nosková (born 1997), Czech luger and Olympics сompetitor
Věra Nosková (born 1947), Czech writer, journalist, and promoter of science and critical thinking
Dionne Nosek (born 1971) American television producer and writer

See also
Noskov / Noskova, Russian surname

Czech-language surnames